Ronald Jones (born July 7, 1954) is an American composer who has written music for several television shows, including Star Trek: The Next Generation, Duck Tales, American Dad!, and Family Guy. He composed the theme song for Nickelodeon's The Fairly Odd Parents with series creator, Butch Hartman, as well as music for the show's  plots. He lives in Stanwood, Washington, where he opened SkyMuse studios which is a recording facility designed for post-production and music recording.

Early life and Career
Jones was born in Kansas City, Kansas. After receiving a degree in music composition and music theory, he moved to Los Angeles, California, to enroll in the Dick Grove School of Music. He studied under Academy Award- and Emmy Award-nominated composer Lalo Schifrin after Schifrin asked Jones to copy a concerto for guitar and orchestra.

While attending Dick Grove, Jones composed an NBC Movie of the Week and began composing for a television series produced by Hanna-Barbera. In addition to writing the music for many cartoons, Jones arranged and composed the theme songs of Smurfs and The Snorks. After five years at Hanna-Barbera, Jones left to work with the composing team of Mike Post and Pete Carpenter. While scoring for Post and Carpenter, Jones worked on popular television series such as The A-Team, Magnum, P.I., and Hardcastle and McCormack. The latter series starred two future Star Trek alumni in the title roles—Brian Keith as Judge Milton C. Hardcastle, and Daniel Hugh Kelly as Mark "Skid" McCormack.

In 1987, Jones was recruited by Chris , the head of Disney Music, to compose music for Disney's first syndicated cartoon series, DuckTales.

Star Trek: The Next Generation

Jones composed the music for 42 episodes of Star Trek: The Next Generation during the first four seasons (1987-1991). However, at the beginning of the fourth season, the producers decided to replace Jones with other composers. Jones has since been a vocal critic of Rick Berman-era Star Trek  and has stated that the music in the subsequent spin-offs is less melodic and more electronic in nature.  He once stated in an interview that he believed the theme for the series Enterprise would have been more suitable for the opening ceremonies of the WNBA.

Family Guy
Jones has created music for the first 12 seasons (1999–2014) of Family Guy.

Jones, with various other music and lyric collaborators, has received four Emmy nominations for his work on this series: Outstanding Original Music and Lyrics in 2000 ("We Only Live to Kiss Your A*s" aka "This House is Freakin' Sweet", from "Peter, Peter, Caviar Eater") and 2011 ("Christmastime is Killing Us", from "Road to the North Pole"); Outstanding Music Composition for a Series in 2008 ("Lois Kills Stewie") and 2011 ("Road to the North Pole"). His collaborative work on the series also earned a Grammy nomination for 2012's Best Song Written for a Visual Media ("Christmastime is Killing Us").

For the two-part episodes of "Stewie Kills Lois and Lois Kills Stewie", Jones paid homage to his own music from a Star Trek: The Next Generation two-part episode, "The Best of Both Worlds" and used parodies of two cues. The piece which originally appeared when Locutus of Borg first appears is reused when Lois reappears in "Lois Kills Stewie". These parodied cues are available on Jones' website.

Awards
 2003 BMI Film and TV Awards: Main Title Theme
 2002 BMI Film and TV Awards: Main Title Theme
 1991 NAIRD Award: Best Soundtrack Album of the Year
 1988 Emmy Awards: Outstanding Sound Mixing for a Drama Series (contributions)

Television scores
DuckTales (1987–1988) Walt Disney Television Animation
Star Trek: The Next Generation (1987–1991) Paramount Domestic Television
Superman (1988) Hanna-Barbera Productions
Family Guy (1999–2014) Fox Broadcasting Company
The Fairly OddParents (theme song) (2001–2017) Nickelodeon/Frederator Studios
American Dad! (2005–2009, left to focus on Family Guy, replaced by Joel McNeely) Fox Broadcasting Company
The Fairly OddParents: Fairly Odder (2022–present) Nickelodeon/Billionfold Inc.

Selected discography
 Star Trek - The Next Generation: Music from the Original Television Soundtrack, Volume Two (The Best of Both Worlds) (GNP Crescendo)
 "Star Trek: The Next Generation - The Ron Jones Project (1987-1999)" released by Film Score Monthly.
 "Superman" (1988 Hanna-Barbera animated series), disc 7 of Superman: The Music (1978-1988), released by Film Score Monthly.
 The Best of Star Trek: 30th Anniversary Special (tracks 6 & 7: Suite from "Heart of Glory") (GNP Crescendo)
 Scooby-Doo's Snack Tracks: The Ultimate Collection (two tracks)

References

External links
 Ron Jones Productions
 
 Ron Jones interview
 Ron Jones interview about FAMILY GUY
 The Influence Jazz Orchestra

1954 births
Living people
American film score composers